Sir John Hall of Dunglass, 3rd Baronet (died 3 July 1776), was one of the Grand Jury for the trial of the Jacobite rising of 1745 rebels at Edinburgh, 1748.

He was retoured heir of line and conquest on 4 January 1750, to his uncle, William Hall of Whitehall, near Chirnside, one of the Principal Clerks of the Court of Session. (National Archives, GD206/1/63).

Sir John married Magdalen (d. 1763), daughter of Sir Robert Pringle, 3rd Baronet, of Stitchill, and was succeeded by his son and heir Sir James Hall, 4th Baronet.

Hall made his home at Dunglass Castle, East Lothian, building a summerhouse and bowling green on the site of an artillery fort constructed during the war known as the Rough Wooing.

References

Pringle of Stichill: the 3rd Baronet married Magdalen Pringle, while her aunt married Sir James Hall, of Dunglass, 2nd Bt.
Ten Parishes of the County of Haddington, by John Martine, edited by E.J.Wilson, Haddington, 1894, p. 214.
Burke's Peerage, Baronetage and Knightage, edited by Peter Townend, 105th edition, London, 1970.

Baronets in the Baronetage of Nova Scotia

1776 deaths

Year of birth missing